The Jghiab or Jgheab is a left tributary of the river Slănic in Romania. It discharges into the Slănic in Mânzălești.

References

Rivers of Romania
Rivers of Buzău County